USS Tenedos, abark of 245 tons,  long, was originally a Pacific whaler, owned by Lawrence and Company of New London, Connecticut. During the American Civil War, the United States Navy purchased her on 16 October 1861 for use in the "Stone Fleet," a group of ships to be sunk as obstructions along the coast of the Confederate States of America. Under the command of Master O. Sisson, she was sunk as blockship in Charleston Harbor off Charleston, South Carolina, on 19 or 20 December 1861.

See also

Union Navy
Union Blockade

References 

History
Shipping Papers from Lahaina

Ships of the Stone Fleet
Ships of the Union Navy
Barques of the United States Navy
Whaling ships
Maritime incidents in December 1861
Scuttled vessels
Shipwrecks of the American Civil War
Shipwrecks of the Carolina coast